The Ho Chi Minh Communist Youth Union ( (Đoàn TNCS)), simply recognized as the Union, is the largest social-political organisation of Vietnamese youth. The union is under the leadership of the Communist Party of Vietnam. The organization was founded on March 26, 1931 and was led and trained by Ho Chi Minh.

History
The Union was founded on 26 March 1931.
From 23 to 26 March 1931, the second congress of Central Committee of the Communist Party of Vietnam was held in Hanoi. Subsequently, in the national congress of the Communist Party of Vietnam (from 22 to 26 March 1961), they decided to select 26 March 1931 to become the founded date of Ho Chi Minh Labor Youth Union, which is one of six former names of Ho Chi Minh Communist Youth Union.

After gaining control of the North, in the meeting in September 1955, the Politburo advocated renaming the Vietnam National Youth Union to the Vietnam Labor Youth Union and the name was officially adopted at the second National Congress of the Vietnam National Youth Union. In the South, a division of the Vietnam Labor Youth Union operating under the name Southern Revolutionary Youth Union, was a member organization of the National Liberation Front of South Vietnam. In the North, in February 1970, the Vietnam Labor Youth Union was renamed the Ho Chi Minh Revolutionary Youth Union to commemorate  the death of Ho Chi Minh. At the same time, the Southern Revolutionary Youth Union also changed its name to Ho Chi Minh Revolutionary Youth Union. After Vietnam unified, in December 1976, the Ho Chi Minh Revolutionary Youth Union and Ho Chi Minh Labor Youth Union merged with the name Ho Chi Minh Communist Youth Union.

References

External links
Official site of the Union

Communist Party of Vietnam
Youth wings of political parties in Vietnam
Youth wings of communist parties
Pioneer movement
Youth organizations established in 1931